Mount Pinbarren is a national park in Queensland, Australia, 129 km north of Brisbane.  It is located in Pinbarren, a locality in the Shire of Noosa.  Mount Pinbarren lies within the South East Queensland bioregion and the Mary River catchment area.

The park protects the naturally vegetated slopes of Mount Pinbarren.  It was established to preserve significant hoop pine complex microphyll vine forest and habitat for the endangered Coxen’s fig parrot.

Access to the park is limited as it is surrounded by private property.

See also

Noosa Biosphere Reserve
 Protected areas of Queensland

References

National parks of Queensland
Protected areas established in 1929
Pinbarren
1929 establishments in Australia